The LIV Legislature of the Congress of the Union met from September 1, 1988, to August 31, 1991.

32 senators and all of the representatives had been elected in the 1988 legislative elections. The representatives served three years and the senators six, continuing into the LV Legislature of the Mexican Congress.

Senate

By political party

By state and the federal district

Parliamentary coordinators 
  Partido Revolucionario Institucional: 
 Netzahualcóyotl de la Vega 
  Partido de la Revolución Democrática: 
 Porfirio Muñoz Ledo

Chamber of Deputies 
The Chamber of Deputies had 500 legislators, elected for three-year terms with no immediate reelection. 300 representatives were elected from uninominal districts and the other 200 from party lists in each of the proportional representation (plurinominal) electoral regions.

Representatives by political party

Representatives of the 300 Uninominal Districts

Representatives of the plurinominal electoral regions 

Alexandro Martínez Camberos 

Noé Aguilar Tinajero

Presidents of the Head Commission 
 (1988 - 1991): Guillermo Jiménez Morales 
 (1991): Socorro Díaz Palacios

Parliamentary coordinators 
 Partido Acción Nacional (PAN):
 Abel Vicencio Tovar 
 Partido Revolucionario Institucional (PRI):
 Guillermo Jiménez Morales 
 Partido Popular Socialista (PPS):
 Francisco Ortíz Mendoza 
 Partido Mexicano Socialista (PMS):
 Pablo Gómez
 Corriente Democrática:
 Ignacio Castillo Mena
 Partido del Frente Cardenista de Reconstrucción Nacional:
 Pedro René Etienne Llano 
 Partido Auténtico de la Revolución Mexicana (PARM):
 Óscar Mauro Ramírez Ayala

References
 Wikipedia in Spanish - LIV Legislatura del Congreso de la Unión de México. Consulted 7 July 2016.

Congress of Mexico by session